Native is a French R&B duo composed of two sisters, Laura Mayne (born 20 January 1968 in Villemomble, Seine-Saint-Denis) and Chris Mayne (born 12 January 1970 in Villemomble). They began their singing career as backup singers with Niagara and Gérald De Palmas. They achieved their first success in 1994 with their single "Si la vie demande ça", a top ten hit in France.

In 1994, they won a Victoires de la musique award for most promising group of the year. They featured on the track "Who the F*** Is This" on the Bubba Sparxxx & The Muddkatz album New South: The Album B4 the Album Mixtape (2003).

After the group split, Laura Mayne released in 2002 her first solo album under the name Native, entitled Laura Mayne-Kerbrat.

In 2003, Chris Mayne formed the band West Isle with Éric Daniel, former member of Sweetness group. They released the album Ailleurs in 2006.

Discography

Albums
 1993: Native
 1995: Nat(l)ive
 1997: Couleurs de l'amour - #27 in France
 2000: Native the best (best of)

Singles
 1993: "Si la vie demande ça" - #9 in France
 1994: "Tu planes sur moi" - #19 in France
 1995: "Sometimes It Snows in April" - #49 in France
 1995: "L'air du vent" (soundtrack of Pocahontas) - #9 in France
 1997: "Dans ce monde à part..." - #41 in France
 1998: "Couleurs de l'amour" - #42 in France

References

Sibling musical duos
People from Villemomble
French musical duos
Musical groups from Île-de-France
French girl groups
21st-century French singers
21st-century French women singers